Gurnard may refer to:

Fish
Sea robins or gurnards, fish of the family Triglidae.
Flying gurnards, fish of the family Dactylopteridae.

Other
Gurnard, Isle of Wight, a village on the Isle of Wight in the British Isles, on
Gurnard Bay
USS Gurnard (SS-254), a United States Navy submarine of the Gato class
USS Gurnard (SSN-662), a United States Navy nuclear fast attack submarine of the Sturgeon Class
Short Gurnard, a fighter biplane